Elistvere Lake is a lake in Tartu Parish, Tartu County, Estonia.

See also
List of lakes of Estonia

References

Tartu Parish
Lakes of Tartu County